Lost and Won may refer to:

 Lost and Won (1915 film), a 1915 British film
 Lost and Won (1917 film), a 1917 American film